Francis N Tolentino (is a Filipino politician and lawyer serving as a Senator since 2019. He served as Chairman of the Metropolitan Manila Development Authority (MMDA) from 2010 to 2015 and was the Mayor of Tagaytay from 1995 to 2004.

For the 19th Congress of the Republic of the Philippines, he is currently the Chairman of the prestigious Senate Blue Ribbon Committee and the Senate Committee on Justice and Human Rights. He is currently the Senate Representative in the Judicial and Bar Council and is also one of the Senate Representatives in the Commission on Appointments.

During the 18th Congress, Tolentino chaired the Senate Committee on Local Government and the Senate Committee on Urban Planning, Housing, and Resettlement.

As a lawyer with multiple degrees, he is a staunch advocate of prioritizing education for all and making justice accessible through the Philippine Legal Justice Center, which he founded. As a Brigadier General of the Philippine Army (Res), he pushes for making the armed forces of the Philippines stronger and formidable. As a lawyer with a masters in international law, he pushes for equal standing for the Philippines in the international community. He is also an advocate of protecting and maintaining the Philippine's territorial integrity through legislation passed in the 18th and 19th Congress. Tolentino established the Philippine Legal Justice Center (PLJC) in Manila, providing free legal services to indigent litigants especially OFWs, and tribal communities.

Early 2022, Tolentino was one of the legislators who pushed for the stoppage of the unregulated online sabong or e-sabong, which caused the destruction of families, loss of lives, and disappearances of sabungeros in the Philippines in 2021 and 2022.

Personal life 
Tolentino was born in Albay, and grew up in Tagaytay, where he lives. He is the first son of Atty. Isaac O. Tolentino, who was the longest-serving mayor of Tagaytay City.

Tolentino is known to be a vintage car aficionado and a sports fan, both international and local. He is currently the President of the Samahan ng Kickboxing ng Pilipinas, the national governing body for the sport of kickboxing in the Philippines.

Education 

Tolentino had his primary education in Lourdes School of Mandaluyong. He obtained his Bachelor of Arts in Philosophy and Bachelor of Laws degree from the Ateneo de Manila University and his Bachelor of Laws (LLB) from Ateneo de Manila University Law School.

Tolentino obtained three (3) Master of Laws degrees, one from the University of Michigan Law School in Ann Arbor (USA) where he concentrated on constitutional law, and another from the University of London in England specializing in public international law where he graduated Second Honors (with merit) with Her Royal Highness Princess Anne giving him the award. He obtained his third (3rd) Master of Laws degree (LLM) from the Ivy League Columbia Law School (New York City), where he displayed "superior academic achievement".

He passed the New York State Bar Exams as well as the Philippine Bar Exams in 1984 where he obtained a general average of 86.25%.

He graduated Master on National Security Administration at the National Defense College of the Philippines where he ranked 6th out of 55 graduates.

Political career

Mayor of Tagaytay City
Tolentino was first appointed to the post of OIC Mayor of Tagaytay from 1986 to 1987. He ran unopposed in the 1995 general election for Mayor of Tagaytay and was re-elected by his constituents for 3 consecutive terms as Mayor from 1995 to 2004. As Mayor, he advocated a City Character Program, espousing values formation among his constituents.

Under his administration, he created the Tagaytay Office of Public Safety, which later became the basis of policies he put into force as chair of the MMDA. He also initialized the Character First programs which encourages governments, government leaders, civic organizations and religious organizations to band together to establish a "city" or "community" of character with character traits of a Filipino every month.

Chairman of the Metro Manila Development Authority

On July 27, 2010, Tolentino was appointed as the ninth chairman of the Metropolitan Manila Development Authority (MMDA).  He is the first and only non-resident of Metro Manila to be appointed to the post.

In August 2013, Tolentino, as MMDA chairman, launched the first Metro Manila Integrated Bus Terminal known as the Southwest Integrated Provincial Transport Terminal (SWIPTT).

On September 19, 2013, Tolentino signed the Metro Manila Outdoor Media Magna Carta along with various advertising groups, setting the terms for regulating outdoor advertisements in Metro Manila. Among the terms in the 15-page agreement were a 216-square meter limitation on all outdoor signs and structures, with 30 percent of the space of ground level ads allotted "for landscape works or vertical gardens". Prior to the signing of the document, no limit had been placed on the size of advertisements, such that a number of billboards as big as 1,000 square meters had been allowed. The document provided a nine-month grace period for advertisers to be able to comply.

To address the traffic situation in Metro Manila and to offer transportation alternative to the public, Tolentino relaunched the Pasig River Ferry System last April 2014, in coordination with the Pasig River Rehabilitation Commission and the Department of Transportation and Communications.

As an environmentalist, one of his advocacies is environmental protection. His plans include creating alternative energy resources that would be beneficial for both the people and the environment. Another advocacy that he is focusing on is the disaster calamity fund. He understands that Mother Nature is unpredictable and it is better to brace for the worst.

As chair of the MMDA, Tolentino was also designated by Metro Manila Commission Executive Order No. 86-09 as chair of the annual Metro Manila Film Festival, in which capacity Tolentino introduced a number of changes, including the introduction of new contest categories and the removal of box office receipts from the criteria for the selection of best picture starting from the 2010 edition.

Presidential Adviser for Political Affairs 
In June 2017, Tolentino was appointed by former President Rodrigo Duterte as his political adviser from 2017 to 2018. He became the former President's main troubleshooter during crises, disasters, and emergencies.

Senator 
Tolentino ran for senator in the 2016 Philippine Senate election, however, he was defeated after placing 13th.

Tolentino ran again for senator in the 2019 Philippine Senate election. Endorsed by President Rodrigo Duterte, he is under the Hugpong ng Pagbabago and the informal Kilusang Pagbabago coalitions.

Tolentino successfully secured the 9th place in the 2019 elections and is serving as a Senator of the Philippines until 2025.

18th Congress

During the 18th Congress, Tolentino chaired the Senate Committee on Local Government and the Senate Committee on Urban Planning, Housing, and Resettlement.

During his stint as Chairman of the Senate Committee on Local Government, Tolentino was a welcomed partner by the Bangsamoros in the transition of the Bangsamoro Autonomous Region in Muslim Mindanao.

19th Congress

Tolentino currently serves as the Chairman of the prestigious Senate Blue Ribbon Committee and the Senate Committee on Justice and Human Rights. He is currently sits as the Senate Representative to the Judicial and Bar Council and is also one of the Senate Representatives in the Commission on Appointments.

He is currently the Vice-Chairman in the following Senate Committees: Agriculture, Food and Agrarian Reform, Constitutional Amendments and Revision of Codes, Foreign Relations, National Defense and Security, Peace, Unification and Reconciliation, Public Order and Dangerous Drugs, and Public Services.

Tolentino also sits as a member in the following Senate Committees: Basic Education, Cooperatives, Cultural Communities and Muslim Affairs, Electoral Reforms and People's Participation, Energy, Environment, Natural Resources and Climate Change, Finance, Games and Amusement, Labor, Employment and Human Resources Development, Local Government, Migrant Workers, Public Works, Sports, Urban Planning, Housing and Resettlement, and Ways and Means.

References

External links

 
 Senator Francis N. Tolentino – Senate of the Philippines

Living people
People from Tagaytay
Bicolano politicians
People from Albay
Senators of the 18th Congress of the Philippines
Chairpersons of the Metropolitan Manila Development Authority
Mayors of places in Cavite
Alumni of the University of London
20th-century Filipino lawyers
Ateneo de Manila University alumni
Benigno Aquino III administration personnel
Duterte administration personnel
1960 births
PDP–Laban politicians
Senators of the 19th Congress of the Philippines